The Cascades Lakes Scenic Byway (Forest Route 46) is a National Scenic Byway in central Oregon in the United States. It offers particularly good views of Mount Bachelor, Broken Top, and the Three Sisters (Oregon) mountains and provides access to many recreational facilities in central Oregon. The route is so named because it weaves past a number of small natural lakes along the Cascades as well as several reservoirs on the upper Deschutes River.

Route description
The northern terminus of the route is in Bend where it changes into NW Century Drive.  It follows the two-lane Century Drive Highway west into the Deschutes National Forest and past the Mt. Bachelor Ski Area, then south along the Cascades into northern Klamath County, where it terminates on its southern end at its junction with Oregon Route 58, approximately 40 mi (64 km) southeast of Oakridge. Along the way, Century Drive (not the Century Drive Highway) turns east to Sunriver.

The Century Drive Highway begins at an interchange with US 97 (the Bend Parkway) in Bend.  It heads west along Colorado Avenue and Century Drive, which it follows to the entrance to the Mount Bachelor Ski Resort, where Century Drive Highway ends.

The Cascade Lakes Scenic Byway continues south along the west side of Mount Bachelor. Beyond Mount Bachelor Ski Area, the byway passes Todd Lake, Sparks Lake, Devils Lake, Elk Lake, Hosmer Lake, Lava Lake, Little Lava Lake, and Cultus Lake.  South of Crane Prairie Reservoir, the two routes split, with the scenic byway continuing to head south towards its terminus at Oregon Route 58. Century Drive instead heads back to the east, north of the Wickiup Reservoir, and then heads northeast parallel to the western shore of the Deschutes River. It eventually crosses the river, runs north for several miles, and then terminates at an intersection with US 97 near the resort community of Sunriver.

References

External links

Info from National Scenic Byways Program
Map and driving directions
Map and driving directions from Bend, Oregon

National Scenic Byways
Scenic highways in Oregon
Cascade Range
National Forest Scenic Byways
Transportation in Deschutes County, Oregon
Deschutes National Forest
Tourist attractions in Deschutes County, Oregon